The world is a common name for the whole of human civilization, specifically human experience, history, or the human condition in general, worldwide, i.e. anywhere on Earth.

World, worlds or the world may also refer to:

Places

 Earth (planet), the world we live in
 World Island, Afro-Eurasia
 The World (archipelago), near Dubai, United Arab Emirates
 Universe
 Astronomical object
 Planet
 Natural satellite
 Dwarf planet

Businesses and companies
 The world (concert hall), Moscow, Russia
 The World (Internet service provider)
 The World (nightclub), a defunct club in New York City
 The World (WWE), a defunct New York City restaurant
 World Publishing Company, a defunct American book publisher

Periodicals 

 The World (Coos Bay), a Coos Bay, Oregon newspaper
 Tulsa World, a Tulsa, Oklahoma newspaper
 The World (South African newspaper), a former Johannesburg newspaper
 The World (1753 newspaper), a former London newspaper
 The World (journal), a British weekly paper published from 1874 to 1920
 The World (Hobart), a former newspaper published in Hobart, Tasmania
 World (magazine), an evangelical news magazine
The World, a 2004 proposed newspaper by Stephen Glover
 El Mundo (Spain), a Spanish newspaper
 Le Monde, a French newspaper
 Die Welt, a German newspaper
 Il Globo, an Italian newspaper in Australia
 National Geographic World, a former name of the magazine National Geographic Kids
 New York World, a former New York City newspaper (1860–1931)
 The Evening World, a former New York City newspaper (1887–1931)
 The World Weekly, an international online newspaper created in 2012

Gaming
 The World (.hack), a fictional game in the franchise .hack
 Need for Speed: World, a 2010 racing game
 Level (video gaming)

Literature
 The World (book), a philosophy book by René Descartes
 "The World", a fictional lab by Weapon Plus in Marvel Comics
 The World, the name of the Stand used by main antagonist DIO in the manga series JoJo's Bizarre Adventure, named after the Tarot card
 The World: A Brief Introduction, a 2020 book by Richard N. Haass
 Worlds (book), a collection of science fiction and fantasy short stories by Eric Flint

Film, television and radio
 World Channel, formerly PBS World, an American television channel
 The World (film), a 2004 Chinese film
 The World (radio program), an American public radio news magazine
 The World (TV program), an Australian news program

Music

Bands 
 This World, an American rock band

Albums
 World (album), by D:Ream, 1995
 The World (Bennie K album), 2007
 The World (U.S. Bombs album), 1999
 The World (EP), by 9mm Parabellum Bullet, 2007
 Worlds (Joe Lovano album), 1989
 Worlds (Porter Robinson album), 2014

Songs
 "World" (Bee Gees song), 1967
 "World" (Five for Fighting song), 2006
 "World" (James Brown song), 1969
 "World" (Lindita song), 2017
 "World (The Price of Love)", by New Order, 1993
 "World", by Richie Sambora from Aftermath of the Lowdown, 2012
 "The World" (Angel song), 2013
 "The World" (Brad Paisley song), 2006
 "The World", by Hardwell, 2011
 "The World", by Nightmare from The World Ruler, 2007
 "_World", by Seventeen from Sector 17, 2022

Other
 World, a computer software suite developed by JD Edwards, a company now owned by Oracle Corporation
 MS The World, a cruise ship
 The World (Tarot card), a Major Arcana in the tarot deck
 Ontological world, by which human beings are able to make sense of things in general, see world disclosure
 World view, the framework of ideas and beliefs through which an individual interprets the world
 World B. Free (born Lloyd B. Free), an American basketball player

See also
 Another World (disambiguation)
 New World (disambiguation)
 Old World (disambiguation)
 One World (disambiguation)
 Possible Worlds (disambiguation)
 This World (disambiguation)
 Worlds Away (disambiguation)
 Wrld (disambiguation)
 Wurld (disambiguation)

ar:عالم (توضيح)
ja:世界 (曖昧さ回避)
ro:Lume (dezambiguizare)